The Río de los Negros is a river of Puerto Rico. It is located in the municipality of Corozal.

See also
 List of rivers of Puerto Rico

References

External links
 USGS Geographic Names Information Service
 USGS Hydrologic Unit Map – Caribbean Region (1974)
 Ríos de Puerto Rico 

Rivers of Puerto Rico